Amir Shapourzadeh (born 19 September 1982) is a former footballer who played as a forward, and is the business manager of Admira Wacker. Born in Iran and raised in Germany, Shapourzadeh made one appearance for the Iran national team.

Club career
Shapourzadeh started his career at Grün-Weiß Eimsbüttel and Niendorfer SV youth clubs, before moving on to Eimsbütteler TV, his first senior side, In 2002 Hamburger SV signed him, but he only played for their amateur side, He was transferred to the amateur side of Hansa Rostock where he built himself up the ranks until he reached the first team, Shapourzadeh signed than after three years with Hansa Rostock in July 2008 for FSV Frankfurt and before joining Iranian side Steel Azin F.C.  in July 2009.

International career
Shapourzadeh was called up to the Iran national team's B squad for the 2007 West Asian Football Federation Championship and debuted in 0–0 draw versus Iraq on 16 June 2007. He was again called up to the national team in May 2008 for a friendly against Zambia in which he appeared as a second half substitution.

Career statistics

References

External links
 

Living people
1982 births
People from Tehran
People from Eimsbüttel
Iranian footballers
Hamburger SV II players
FC Hansa Rostock players
FSV Frankfurt players
Bundesliga players
2. Bundesliga players
3. Liga players
Iran international footballers
Association football forwards
Iranian emigrants to Germany
Eimsbütteler TV players
Sportfreunde Lotte players
Kickers Offenbach players